Abok Izam is a Nigerian politician. He was the lawmaker representing Jos East constituency and former Speaker of the Plateau State House of Assembly under the platform of the All Progressives Congress (APC) political party.

Personal life 
Abok Izam was born in Jos East constituency. He is currently a final year law student at the University of Jos.

References 

21st-century Nigerian politicians
Year of birth missing (living people)
Living people
University of Jos alumni